Ian Macfarlane may refer to:
 Ian Macfarlane (economist) (born 1946), Australian economist, governor of the Reserve Bank of Australia, 1996–2006
 Ian MacFarlane (footballer, born 1933) (1933–2019), Scottish football player and manager
 Ian MacFarlane (footballer, born 1968), Scottish football player
 Ian Macfarlane (politician) (born 1955), Australian politician

See also
 Ian McFarlane (born 1959), Australian music journalist
 Ian McFarlane (literary scholar) (1915–2002), British scholar of French literature
 Ian Macfarlan (1881–1964), Australian politician